

Robin Haydon Darwall-Smith FRHistS is a British archivist, based in Oxford and associated with several Oxford University College archives.

Robin Darwall-Smith studied classics at University College, Oxford under George Cawkwell, as an undergraduate and postgraduate. He then trained as an archivist at the University of Liverpool. While at Oxford, Darwall-Smith represented University College on the television quiz show University Challenge in 1987.

Darwall-Smith has been an archivist for Jesus College, Magdalen College, and University College at Oxford.

Robin Darwall-Smith was elected a Fellow of the Royal Historical Society in 2010. He appeared on the television documentary series Ian Hislop's Olden Days in 2014.

Selected books
Robin Darwall-Smith has written a number of books, including:

 The Jowett papers: A summary catalogue of the papers of Benjamin Jowett (1817–1893) at Balliol College, Oxford. Balliol College Library, 1993. 
 Emperors and Architecture: A Study of Flavian Rome, Peeters. 1996. 
 Account Rolls of University College, Oxford, Vol I (1381–1471), John Wiley & Sons, 1999. 
 Account Rolls of University College, Oxford, Vol II (1472–1597), Oxford Historical Society, 2001. 
 The Architectural Drawings of Magdalen College: A Catalogue, Oxford University Press, 2002.  (with Roger White)
 A History of University College, Oxford, Oxford University Press, 2008. 
 Early Records of University College, Oxford Historical Society, 2015.

See also
 List of archivists
 The Annals of University College

References

External links
 
 Dr Robin Darwall-Smith: Can a Great Man be a Good Master? William Beveridge as Master of Univ on Vimeo
 University Challenge – 1st September 1987 on YouTube

Year of birth missing (living people)
Living people
20th-century English male writers
20th-century English historians
21st-century English writers
21st-century English male writers
21st-century English historians
Alumni of University College, Oxford
Alumni of the University of Liverpool
English archivists
English local historians
People associated with Jesus College, Oxford
People associated with Magdalen College, Oxford
People associated with University College, Oxford
Fellows of the Royal Historical Society